Melissa Chessington Leo (born September 14, 1960) is an American actress. She is the recipient of several accolades, including an Academy Award, a Primetime Emmy Award, a Golden Globe Award, a Screen Actors Guild Award and two Critics' Choice Awards.

After appearing on several television shows and films in the 1980s, Leo became a regular on the television shows All My Children, for which she was nominated for a Daytime Emmy Award, and The Young Riders. Her breakthrough role came in 1993 as detective and later sergeant Kay Howard on the television series Homicide: Life on the Street (1993–1997).

Leo received critical acclaim for her performance as Ray Eddy in the 2008 film Frozen River, earning her several nominations and awards, including an Academy Award nomination for Best Actress. In 2010, Leo won several awards for her performance as Alice Eklund-Ward in the film The Fighter, including the Academy Award for Best Supporting Actress.

In 2013, she won a Primetime Emmy Award for her guest role on the television series Louie. She starred in the 2015 Fox event series Wayward Pines as Nurse Pam. She then starred in the 2017 Netflix film The Most Hated Woman in America as American Atheists founder Madalyn Murray O'Hair.

Early life
Leo was born in Manhattan and grew up on the Lower East Side. She is the daughter of Margaret (née Chessington), a California-born teacher, and Arnold Leo III, an editor at Grove Press, fisherman, and former spokesman for the East Hampton Baymen's Association. She has an older brother, Erik Leo. Her paternal aunt is art historian Christine Leo Roussel. Leo's parents divorced, and her mother moved them to Red Clover Commune, in Putney, Vermont.

Leo began performing as a child with the Bread and Puppet Theater Company. She attended Bellows Falls High School in Bellows Falls, Vermont, and studied acting at Mountview Academy of Theatre Arts in London and SUNY Purchase, but did not graduate, choosing to leave school and move to New York City to begin auditioning for acting jobs. Leo spent summers at her father's house in Springs, a section of East Hampton, New York.

Career
Leo's acting debut came in 1984, for which she was nominated for a Daytime Emmy at the 12th Daytime Emmy Awards for Outstanding Ingenue/Woman in a Drama Series for All My Children. Following this, Leo appeared in several films, including Streetwalkin', A Time of Destiny, Last Summer in the Hamptons, and Venice/Venice. She also had several appearances on television, most notably her role as Det. Sgt. Kay Howard on Homicide: Life on the Street until 1997. Three years later she reprised her role in the television movie, Homicide: The Movie. After a brief hiatus from acting, Leo's breakthrough came three years later in the Alejandro González Iñárritu film, 21 Grams released to critical acclaim. Leo appeared in a supporting role alongside Sean Penn, Naomi Watts, Benicio del Toro, and Clea DuVall. Leo shared a Best Ensemble Acting award from the Phoenix Film Critics Society in 2003 and the runner-up for the Los Angeles Film Critics Association for Best Supporting Actress.

Leo appeared in supporting roles throughout the 2000s including the film Hide and Seek, the independent film American Gun, both in 2005, and a minor role in the comedy Mr. Woodcock. In 2006, she won the Bronze Wrangler at the Western Heritage Awards for Outstanding Theatrical Motion Picture for The Three Burials of Melquiades Estrada shared with Tommy Lee Jones who also produced the film. In 2008, she won the Maverick Actor Award and also the Best Actress award at the Method Fest for Lullaby (2008).

That same year, Leo earned critical praise for her performance in the film Frozen River, winning several awards, including the Best Actress award from the Independent Spirit Awards, the Spotlight award from the National Board of Review, and Best Actress nominations from the Screen Actors Guild Awards, Broadcast Film Critics Association, and Academy Awards. Critic Roger Ebert backed her for a win, stating: "Best Actress: Melissa Leo. What a complete performance, evoking a woman's life in a time of economic hardship. The most timely of films, but that isn't reason enough. I was struck by how intensely determined she was to make the payments, support her two children, carry on after her abandonment by a gambling husband, and still maintain rules and goals around the house. This was a heroic woman."

Following Frozen River, Leo continued to appear in several independent films, and had a minor role in the 2008 film Righteous Kill, with Al Pacino and her Hide and Seek co-star, Robert De Niro. Leo appeared in a series of films throughout 2009, including According to Greta, the title character in Stephanie's Image, True Adolescents, and Veronika Decides to Die.

In 2010, Leo received fame for her role in David O. Russell's The Fighter. Rick Bentley of The Charlotte Observer said: "Both actors (Mark Wahlberg and Christian Bale) are very good, but they get blown off the screen by Melissa Leo, who plays their mother, Alice Ward. Leo's Oscar-worthy portrayal of Alice as a master manipulator goes beyond acting to a total transformation." Roger Ebert referred to it as a "teeth-gratingly brilliant performance." Leo and several of the film's actors including her co-star Amy Adams and Bale were nominated. For her performance Leo received several awards, including the Golden Globe, Dallas-Fort Worth Film Critics Association, New York Film Critics Circle, Screen Actors Guild, and culminating in her winning the Academy Award for Best Supporting Actress. While accepting her Oscar, Leo said: "When I watched Kate two years ago, it looked so fucking easy!" She apologized afterwards for using profanity, admitting that it was "a very inappropriate place to use that particular word ... those words, I apologize to anyone that they offend".

Prior to her win, Leo had created some controversy by attempting to self-promote her Oscar campaign, rather than rely on the marketing department of the studio. Leo personally bought ad space in Hollywood trade publications, which was initially thought might backfire in a similar manner to previous Oscar contenders Chill Wills and Margaret Avery.

Following her Oscar win, Leo appeared in the HBO miniseries Mildred Pierce alongside Kate Winslet, Evan Rachel Wood and Guy Pearce. Her performance garnered an Emmy Award nomination for Outstanding Supporting Actress in a Miniseries or a Movie. Her next projects include the satirical horror film Red State, the independent comedy Predisposed with Jesse Eisenberg currently in pre-production and the crime thriller The Dead Circus based on the novel by John Kaye with Michael C. Hall and James Marsden currently in development. She guest-starred in an episode of the hit FX comedy Louie, which garnered her an Emmy win for Outstanding Guest Actress in a Comedy Series.

Leo appeared in the action-thriller Olympus Has Fallen as Ruth McMillan, the Secretary of Defense who was held hostage by terrorists in the White House and Oblivion as the main antagonist Sally. She reprised her role in the Olympus sequel London Has Fallen.

Leo appeared in supporting roles in the thriller films Prisoners, The Equalizer, and The Equalizer 2, having previously appeared in a 1985 episode of the original series. Leo appeared on the Fox series Wayward Pines as Nurse Pam.

Personal life
Leo lives in Stone Ridge, New York. In 1987, she had a son, John Matthew "Jack" Heard, with actor John Heard, whom she dated from 1986 to 1988. She considers director Adam Davenport a "son of sorts."

Leo publicly rejected the label of feminist in statements made during a 2012 interview with Salon: "I don't think of myself as a feminist at all. As soon as we start labeling and categorizing ourselves and others, that's going to shut down the world. I would never say that." She reiterated these sentiments in a 2017 interview.

Filmography

Film

Television

Stage

Awards and nominations

References

External links

 
 

1960 births
Living people
Actresses from New York City
American film actresses
American television actresses
American voice actresses
Best Supporting Actress Academy Award winners
Best Supporting Actress Golden Globe (film) winners
Independent Spirit Award for Best Female Lead winners
People from the Lower East Side
Independent Spirit Award winners
State University of New York at Purchase alumni
20th-century American actresses
21st-century American actresses
Method actors
Outstanding Performance by a Female Actor in a Supporting Role Screen Actors Guild Award winners
Primetime Emmy Award winners